Shatrudhan Tiwari also known as Chokar Baba is a Member of Bihar Legislative Assembly representing Amnour (Vidhan Sabha constituency) in Saran, Bihar, India.

Early life 
Tiwari was born at Amnour, Bihar, India. He completed his high school from Rai Saheb Paiga High School, Amnour.

Political career 
Tiwari was a social worker prior to entering politics. He joined Bharatiya Janata Party in 2005 and was elected as a member of Bihar Legislative Assembly in assembly elections of 2015. He represents Amnour (Vidhan Sabha constituency). He was nominated as BJP candidate from the same constituency in assembly elections of 2010 but lost to Krishna Kumar of Janata Dal (United).

References

External links 

Living people
21st-century Indian politicians
Bihari politicians
1960 births